Oligodon cinereus, the ashy kukri snake, ashy kukri snake, black cross-barred kukri snake, golden kukri snake,  or Günther's kukri snake, is a species of snake in the family Colubridae.

Description
See snake scales for terminology
Nasal divided; portion of rostral seen from above as long as its distance from tho frontal or a little shorter; suture between the internasals usually shorter than that between the prefrontals: frontal as long as its distance from the end of the snout, as long as the parietals; loreal usually longer than deep; preocular single, usually with a small subocular below, between the third and fourth labials; one or two postoculars; temporals 1+2; upper labials 8, fourth and fifth entering the eye, 3 or 4 lower labials in contact with the anterior chin-shields; posterior chin-shields one half or loss than one half the size of the anterior. Scales in 17 rows. Ventrals 160-180 (196); anal undivided; subcaudals 34–39. Pale brown, purplish or reddish above; markings on the head very indistinct; uniform above and below. Total length 30 inches; tail 3.

Distribution
Oligodon cinereus occurs in northeast India (Assam; Arunachal Pradesh), Bangladesh, Myanmar, Thailand, Cambodia, Laos, Vietnam, Peninsular Malaysia, and southern China (including Hong Kong and Hainan).

References

cinereus
Reptiles of Bangladesh
Reptiles of Cambodia
Snakes of China
Snakes of Vietnam
Snakes of Asia
Reptiles of Hong Kong
Reptiles of India
Reptiles of Laos
Reptiles of Malaysia
Reptiles of Myanmar
Reptiles of Thailand
Reptiles of Vietnam
Reptiles described in 1864
Taxa named by Albert Günther